Pavel Karmanov (born February 12, 1970, in Bratsk, Soviet Union) is a composer and a Russian rock musician.

Karmanov was introduced to music by his mother, a pianist. As the result his first compositions were written in Novosibirsk at the early age of 5.
In the late 1970s he moved to Moscow, where was accepted to the Central School of Music for gifted young musicians, which he graduated in 1988. In 1995 he graduated from Tchaikovsky Conservatory. In Moscow he studied with:
1978–1981 - Georgy Dmitriev (ru)
1978–1995 - Professor Alexey Nikolayev
1978–1995 - Professor Albert Leman
1981–1995 - Anatoly Bykanov
1985–1995 - Professor Yuri Kholopov

In 1996 Karmanov was accepted to the Moscow Composers Union.

From 2000 through 2017 he was a permanent member of an alternative rock group Vezhlivy Otkaz.

Festivals
He is a regular participant of the major music festivals, such as: 
Moscow Autumn - 1991, 1996, 1997, 1998, 2006
The Alternative -  1990, 1996, 1997, 1998 Moscow, Russia
SoundRoute 1999 Tokio - Moscow festival in Japan
Warsaw Autumn Poland - 2005 
Shostakovich Festival in Seattle US - 2006.

Performances
Karmanov’s pieces are performed at the Moscow Conservatory, the St. Petersburg Philharmonics, and concerts and festivals around the world. 
His music is regularly performed by Alexei Lubimov, Yuri Bashmet, Vadym Kholodenko (Van Cliburn International Piano Competition winner - 2013), Tatiana Grindenko and "OPUSPOSTH", the percussionist Mark Pekarsky and his ensemble, the pianists Polina Osetinskaya, Mikhail Dubov, and other prominent Russian musicians and orchestras.
Among the foreign performers playing pieces by this composer:
 PADSEnsemble (Italy) 
 Seattle Chamber Players ensemble (US) 
 The Odeon Quartet (US)
 Beethoven quartet (Basel, Switzerland)

Awards
 2005 Golden Eagle Award for Best Original Score for Soldatsky dekameron
 2009 Bessie Award

Screen works 
Karmanov has also composed music for movies and documentaries. The collection includes 
 Bolshoi  director Valery Todorovsky
 Arena (Gladiatrix)  director Timur Bekmambetov, producer — Roger Corman (US) 
 Soldatsky dekameron  by Andrei Proshkin
 Gulf Stream Under the Iceberg  by Evgeny Pashkevich
 documentaries by Alexei Khanyutin, including "Music for the Fireworks" and "The Road" etc.

Karmanov created soundtracks for television series. Some of it:
 "Only you”, by Nana Dzhordzhadze
 "Multiplying Grieve” by Oleg Fesenko.

He composed music for various cartoons including animated movies by Ivan Maximov.

Stage work
In 2009, in New York, the choreographer Pam Tanowitz won the new dance award “The Bessies”, using Pavel's music for her show titled ”Be in the Gray with me”. Karmanov also received the award for his music.

In June 2013 Bolshoi Theatre staged Alexander Borodin's Prince Igor, which was warmly received by audiences and critics. The new opera is shorter, with director cutting out some parts of the opera. Karmanov and Vladimir Martynov worked on the opera's score to accommodate the new structure. According to Vassily Sinaisky, the Bolshoi chief conductor, such a new structure of the opera was conceived to make it more dynamic and intense.

Recordings
Since 1997, Karmanov’s music is playing on TV and radio around the world.

In 2006 Nazar Kozhuhar and his ensemble “The Pocket symphony” recorded and released Karmanov’s first CD with chamber music 

In 2014 FANCYMUSIC records released the second disc titled «Get in».

Major works

 "Re-Major III" for piano, vibraphone and string quintet (1992) 
 Premiere Moscow, I-st Festival of memory of violinist Oleg Kagan with Alexander Melnikov (piano) and  Yuri Bashmets "Moscow Soloists" 
 Yakutsk, Russia, "Yakutsk camerata"  - https://www.youtube.com/watch?v=EdvvjKYMGNU
 Trio "Birthday present for myself", Viola, Cello and Piano (1993) 
 Premiere - Festival of "Alternativa». Moscow
 Paris, France, at 59 RIVOLI "chez Robert, électrons libres" - https://www.youtube.com/watch?v=ipHncihudyY 
 Vadim Kholodenko - https://www.youtube.com/watch?v=wVjo3hqDZcU  
"Music for the Firework" for chamber ensemble (1997) 
 Premiere Moscow, Festival of "Alternativa» with Nazar Kozhukhar & The Pocket symphony - https://www.youtube.com/watch?v=LtwFksDC2KI
 "Different ... rains" for flute, piano and magnetic tape (1996) 
 Premiere Festival "SoundRoute 1999 Tokio - Moscow" in Japan with Oleg Khudyakov (flute), Alexei Lubimov (piano)
 Maria Fedotova (Flute), Polina Osetinskaya (Piano) - https://www.youtube.com/watch?v=5fvqHiPg9QY 
 "Seven minutes before Christmas" for flute, piano and magnetic tape (1996) 
 Maria Fedotova, Yuri Bashmets "Moscow Soloists" - https://www.youtube.com/watch?v=T33iyxocg5I 
 "String quaREtet" (1997) 
 Tallinn, "Eesti musika paevad", Estonia Vlad Pesin (Vn), Marina Katarzhnova ( Vn), Asya Sorshneva (Viola), Petr Kondrashin (Cello) 3/25/2011 - https://www.youtube.com/watch?v=ZdamO9eHBhY 
 "ForellenQuintet" ("Trout-quintet") (1998) 
 Nazar Kozhukhar & The Pocket symphony, film by Andrey Klimenko - https://www.youtube.com/watch?v=1fzNdg06Bf8 
 Seattle, US - https://www.youtube.com/watch?v=DC9dvsYdhq0 
 "Schlaf, mein Herz, schlaf ein" for soloists, 3 choirs and orchestra (2000) 
 Tatiana Grindenko & The OPUS POSTH, Mark Pekarski percussion project, Sirin ensemble, Moscow Choir by Gennady Dmitryak - http://pavelkarmanov.com/node/205
 "GreenDNA" for String Orchestra (2000) for strings 
 Big Hall of Moscow conservatory - https://www.youtube.com/watch?v=Hkd-LhBAu-k  
 "Den" (folk drama "Death of King Herod") for soloists, choir, rock band and orchestra (2002) 
 part #5 - https://www.youtube.com/watch?v=T41vl9LOfWc (slideshow) 
 9/11 for chamber orchestra in the memory of tragedy in NYC (2001)
 2002 Nazar Kozhukhar & The Pocket symphony - https://www.youtube.com/watch?v=ua5lJnqFgNM
  "The Word" for soloists and mixed choir (2002) 
 Premiere. Great hall of St. Petersbourg philharmony. Youth Choir of Saint Petersburg Philharmonic's society, Conductor Yulia Khutoretskaya - https://www.youtube.com/watch?v=xQk0lEQHTGQ 
 «Second snow at the Stadium» for viola and piano (2003) 
 Maxim Novikov (Viola), Petr Aidu (Piano), Kevork Mourad (painting) - https://www.youtube.com/watch?v=EJ0LIRUUib8 
 «Intermezzo» for piano and orchestra (2004) 
 Alexey Goribol (Piano) & The One orchestra (Russia) - https://www.youtube.com/watch?v=Uumv7zDIsY4 
 «Get in» for 5 performers (2005). SCP commission.
 Premiere - Seattle (US) - https://www.youtube.com/watch?v=RBi9V1wl1QM   
 Warsaw yesen (Warshav autumn), Poland– 2005
 «Cambridge music» for Piano Quartet (2008) 
 England premiere – London, Cambridge, Oxford - https://www.youtube.com/watch?v=1GfttBghxO0 
 «Innerlichkeit» («sincerity, intimacy") for two pianos, flute, harp and string quintet (2009) 
 space slideshow - https://www.youtube.com/watch?v=4ba8x63NeWM 
 Music for video installations by a group of artists AES+F
 Feast of Trimalchio (2009) - http://aesf-group.com/projects/the_feast_of_trimalchio/
 Allegoria sacra (2011) - http://aesf-group.com/projects/allegoria_sacra/
 INVERSO MUNDUS (2015) 
 Twice a double concerto (2009) for 2 chamber orchestras in different tunings
 Different tuning. Moscow premiere - https://www.youtube.com/watch?v=1JlftPpmK0Y
 Same Tuning. European premiere, Riga, Latvia - https://www.youtube.com/watch?v=-OZ0hp8nh50 
 Force majeur for 2 violins and 2 pianos (2010) 
 Moscow premiere - https://www.youtube.com/watch?v=QC0ArnaJzBI (live), 
 recordings - https://www.youtube.com/watch?v=tyR03efGGEA 
 Different brooks - order of Tallinn festival
 "Eesti musika paevad" Estonia (2011) - https://www.youtube.com/watch?v=GUWAZx2us3w  
 "Day One" for viola, children's choir, organ and percussion (2011) 
 Premiere at the Dome Cathedral in Riga, Latvia - https://www.youtube.com/watch?v=59xNTBooiqQ
 "Funny Valentine" for viola and harp (2012) 
 Maxim Novikov, Valentina Borisova. premiere - Riga, Latvia - https://www.youtube.com/watch?v=8ETlJ2UG1Bg 
 "The City I Love and Hate", Piano sextet (2012) commissioned by Basel music festival "Culturescapes"
  Premiere at "Culturescapes"  - https://www.youtube.com/watch?v=kqcDZDwz2O4
 Oratorio "5 Angels" for mixed choir, soloists and chamber choir (2013)  Commissioned by international Festival "Academia of Orthodox Music"
 Yulia Khutoretskaya & The Young chamber choir & The One Orchestra. Solo Violas - Maxim Novikov, Alexey Bogorad. Conductor Yulia Khutoretskaya. Russia, St.-Petersburg, 07/16/2013 - https://www.youtube.com/watch?v=CvLj0W6v8Kg 
 "Past perfect" for Piano solo commissioned by Ksenia Bashmet (2015) 
 Moscow premiere - https://www.youtube.com/watch?v=9Orn9LplPeQ 
 "La musica con Cello" for Cello and Orchestra (2015) commissioned by cellist Boris Andrianov 
 Great hall of Moscow conservatoire premiere - https://www.youtube.com/watch?v=UqHEyMgcI3U

References

External links
Pavel Karmanov's official website

Bessie Award winners
Russian composers
Russian male composers
1970 births
Living people